The 1987 Pontins Professional was the fourteenth edition of the professional invitational snooker tournament which took place in May 1987 in Prestatyn, Wales.

The tournament featured eight professional players. The quarter-final matches were contested over the best of 9 frames, the semi-final matches over the best of 11 frames, and the final over the best of 17 frames.

Neal Foulds won the event for the first time, beating Willie Thorne 9–8 in the final.

Main draw

References

Pontins Professional
Snooker competitions in Wales
Pontins Professional
Pontins Professional
Pontins Professional